Pichaqa (Aymara pichaqa, phichaqa, piqacha a big needle, also spelled Pichaka) is a  mountain in the Andes of Bolivia. It is situated in the La Paz Department, Pacajes Province, Calacoto Municipality. Pichaqa lies north-east of the Anallajsi volcano.

References 

Mountains of La Paz Department (Bolivia)